Chris Bush (born July 22, 1981 in Metairie, Louisiana) is an American and Canadian football player.  

Bush played college football at Tulane University as a wide receiver.  In his final year there, he started 20 games for Tulane catching 37 passes for an average of 18 yards per reception.  After college, Bush was signed by the Tennessee Titans of the National Football League as an undrafted free agent, but was released in August 2005.  He subsequently signed with the BC Lions of the Canadian Football League in May 2006. He helped the Lions win the 2006 Grey Cup.

Early years
Bush attended East St. John High School in Reserve, Louisiana. He was named All-River Parish while catching 94 passes for 1,260 yards and 35 touchdowns. He was also All-State in both long jump and triple jump.

External links
 CFL profile

1981 births
Tulane Green Wave football players
BC Lions players
American players of Canadian football
Tennessee Titans players
Living people
People from Metairie, Louisiana
Players of American football from Louisiana